Schwefel (German for sulfur) is a German surname. Notable people with the surname include: 

 Hans-Paul Schwefel (born 1940), German computer scientist and professor emeritus at University of Dortmund
 Harald Schwefel, German physicist
 Norbert Schwefel (born 1960), German musician 

German-language surnames